Luke Youngblood (born 12 June 1986) is a British actor. He is known for playing Ben in The Story of Tracy Beaker, young Simba in The Lion King at several London venues, Lee Jordan in the Harry Potter film series, and Magnitude on the NBC comedy series Community. From 2015 to 2016, he played Sid in the ABC musical comedy series Galavant.

Filmography

Film

Television

Video games

References

External links

1986 births
Living people
20th-century English male actors
21st-century English male actors
English people of Kenyan descent
Black British male actors
Male actors from London
English male film actors
English male television actors
English male voice actors
English male child actors